Libertad is a department of Chaco Province in Argentina.

The provincial subdivision has a population of about 11,000 inhabitants in an area of  1,088 km2, and its capital city is Puerto Tirol.

Settlements

Colonia Popular
Fortin Cardoso
General Obligado
Laguna Blanca
Puerto Tirol

References

External links
Puerto Tirol Municipal Website (Spanish)

1888 establishments in Argentina
Departments of Chaco Province